Gulbenes Sporta Centrs is a multi-purpose stadium in Gulbene, Latvia.  It is currently used mostly for football matches and is the home stadium of FB Gulbene. The stadium holds 1,500 people.

Gulbene
Football venues in Latvia
Multi-purpose stadiums in Latvia